Daniël van den Queborn (1552–1618) was a Dutch Golden Age painter.

Biography
Van den Queborn was born in Antwerp.  According to the RKD he became a member of the Antwerp Guild of St. Luke in 1577, but left the city and joined the guild in Middelburg in 1579. In 1594 he became court painter to Prince Maurits. He died in The Hague.

References

artindex.nl

External links

1552 births
1602 deaths
Dutch Renaissance painters
Painters from Middelburg
Painters from Antwerp
Court painters